Les Aventuriers de Koh-Lanta was the first season of the French version of Survivor, Koh-lanta. This season took place in Thailand on the island of Koh Rok, and was broadcast on TF1 from August 4, 2001 to September 22, 2001 airing on Saturdays and Sundays at 6:55 p.m.

The winner of this season of Koh-lanta was Gilles, who took home the prize of €100,000.

Contestants

Future appearances
Jean-Luc Florina returned for Koh-Lanta: Le Retour des Héros. Guénaëlle Biras returned for Koh-Lanta: La Revanche des Héros. Sandra Acabado returned for Koh-Lanta: La Nouvelle Édition.

Challenges

Eliminations Table

Ratings

External links
(Official Site Archive) 

01
2001 French television seasons
Television shows filmed in Thailand